In Russia, Ukraine, and other former Soviet Union republics, the term sanatorium is generally used for a combination resort/recreational facility and a medical facility to provide short-term complex rest and medical services.  It is similar to spa resorts but with medical services.

On the other hand, for most Slavs, including Russians, Ukrainians, Czechs, and other ethnic groups, sanatorium mostly means a kind of hotel with health resort facilities and various available services (such as massage, pools, saunas, aromatherapy, oxygen therapy, etc.) not covered by medical insurance. It is mostly, without any double connotation, a spa resort where relatively healthy people can rest and recuperate during a regular job vacation. For example, Sanatorium Astória and others located in Karlovy Vary, Czech Republic, or Geneva Sanatorium Hotel in Ukraine, serve this purpose.  Usually in this case a doctor's prescription is not required. However, a general practitioner is available and it is recommended guests check their health status at the beginning and end of their stay.

Sanatoriums first began to achieve prominence in the USSR in the early 1920s, with the introduction of the Labour Code of the Russian Soviet Federative Socialist Republic, which established basic recommendations and standards for workers in Russia (distinct labour codes of the Soviet republics would later be standardized in 1970). This Labour Code guaranteed at least two weeks of annual leave for all workers, recommending that it be spent at a sanatorium for health reasons. By 1990, sanatoriums in the USSR could hold up to 50,000 guests at once. After the dissolution of the Soviet Union, many sanatoriums fell into disrepair, some becoming refugee camps, but a number of sanatoriums across the former republics still operate. Lake Issyk-Kul in Kyrgyzstan was known for its santoria, some of which have been refurbished.

References

Resorts by type
Soviet culture
Health in the Soviet Union
Society of the Soviet Union
History of Russia
History of Ukraine